Stock Judging Pavilion may refer to:

Stock Judging Pavilion (Oskaloosa, Iowa), listed on the National Register of Historic Places in Mahaska County, Iowa
Stock Judging Pavilion (Brookings, South Dakota), listed on the National Register of Historic Places in Brookings County, South Dakota